Mansfield 103.2 FM is an Independent Local Radio station in Mansfield, Nottinghamshire, serving the areas of Mansfield and Ashfield in Nottinghamshire and nearby Bolsover in Derbyshire. 

It was launched in 1999 after winning a licence to broadcast from the Radio Authority in 1998. Based at the Brunts Business Centre, near the centre of Mansfield, it uses a shared transmitter mast sited at Fishpond Hill, on the outskirts of Mansfield near to Skegby.

Mansfield 103.2's Managing Director is Tony Delahunty and the Managing Editor is Ian Watkins.

The station is Mansfield's only local radio station.

Programming
Schedules include news on the hour (local, national, and international from Sky News), a breakfast show (presented by John B Tannen on weekdays, Si Gilmore on Saturdays and Katie Trinder on Sundays),  a mid-morning show (presented by Jason Harrison on weekdays and Katie Trinder at weekends)
 and an afternoon show (presented by Ian Watkins on weekdays and Sundays, and Rob Wain on Saturdays). 
Extra shows include Chequered Flag with Matt Edwards on Monday evenings, the Business and NHS shows on Tuesday and Thursday respectively (both presented by Tony Delahunty), the Sunday evening show with Mark Jones and the 80s and 90s School Reunions on Friday and Saturday nights respectively.

News and sport coverage 
Mansfield 103.2 has a news and sport team based at Samuel Brunts Way, staffed by the managing editor and broadcast journalists. Each Saturday in the football season there are regular updates on local games in the area including Mansfield Town, Chesterfield F.C. Derby County, Nottingham Forest, Notts County, South Normanton Athletic F.C., Glapwell F.C., Shirebrook Town F.C. and Sutton Town F.C.

Outside broadcasts
Mansfield 103.2 has an outside broadcast unit named Fix Auto Street Crusader. The vehicle is manned by the commercial producer and engineer, with an outside broadcast team, and is used for visits to local charities, public events, openings, businesses and services.

Sales team
Mansfield 103.2 have a team of advertising executives led by a sales consultant.

The Gooseberry Pork Pie
In July 2010, Mansfield 103.2 revived a 70-year-old Mansfield Tradition of a Gooseberry Pork Pie. Years ago in Mansfield, the town would celebrate with a giant pork pie filled with Gooseberries. The pie was not made since the end of the Second World War, but in July 2010 The Breakfast Show brought back the tradition, by creating a batch of small gooseberry filled pies with the help of local butchers.

See also

 That Friday Feeling
 Mansfield Town FC

References

 Rajar Listening Figures, retrieved 2014-02-03

Mansfield
Music in Nottinghamshire
Radio stations established in 1999
1999 establishments in England